Make Yourself is the third studio album by American rock band Incubus, released through Epic Records on October 26, 1999. It is certified double platinum by the Recording Industry Association of America (RIAA) and produced three charting singles—"Pardon Me", "Stellar", and "Drive"—all of which reached the top three of the Billboard Alternative Songs chart, with the latter topping the chart and also becoming the band's sole top ten hit to date on the  Billboard Hot 100, where it peaked at number nine.

The album is the first to be recorded with new turntablist Chris Kilmore, who replaced DJ Lyfe.

Composition

Style and genres
Make Yourself has been described as an alternative metal, alternative rock, nu metal, and funk rock album.

Release and touring
Shortly after the album's release, a thrash metal/death metal band from Louisiana called Incubus were forced to change their name. The band, now known as Opprobrium, had released two critically acclaimed albums in 1988 and 1990, and were not aware of this Incubus prior to the release of Make Yourself. The name change was voluntarily made in order to avoid confusion and any potential conflicts between the two bands.

To support Make Yourself, the band and Buckethead opened for Primus on their Antipop tour in 1999, including at a millennium show on December 31, 1999. Early the following year, they performed at the SnoCore Tour with System of a Down and Mr. Bungle (who broke up shortly afterwards). The members of Incubus have since spoken of their pleasure at getting to play with Primus and Mr. Bungle, two artists whom they cite as influences. From October to November 2000, Incubus and Taproot supported Deftones on their "Back to School" tour for the album White Pony.

In 1999 and 2000, music videos were made for the singles "Pardon Me", "Stellar" and "Drive". Less widely seen music videos were also made for the non-singles "I Miss You", "Privilege" and "Out from Under". The music video for "Stellar" featured Brandon Boyd's then-girlfriend Jo. A tour edition for the album was released in 2001, with a second disc containing three acoustic tracks and one live track.

Reception

Make Yourself has received generally positive reviews from critics. Steve Huey of AllMusic awarded it four out of five stars, writing "Make Yourself makes a bid for broader mainstream success while keeping the group rooted in a hybrid of familiar late '90s alt-metal (i.e., roaring guitars, white-noise sonic textures, and an undercurrent of electronics) and Chili Pepper funk-rock. Where S.C.I.E.N.C.E. sometimes veered abruptly between the two genres without really fusing them, Make Yourself finds the band settling more comfortably into its sound."

Sal Cinquemani of Slant Magazine also gave it four out of five stars, writing in April 2001, "whether it’s rehashed hard rock or a non-enterprising rap-metal hybrid, there isn’t much to differentiate between most rock bands these days. Incubus, however, sets themselves apart with their second full-length release Make Yourself. A superb blend of metal guitar riffs, classic punk-rock mentality, and subtle hip hop and electronic elements, Incubus doesn’t just imitate these genres, but rather, redefines them in an otherwise non-revolutionary rock landscape." The New Rolling Stone Album Guide states that on Make Yourself, "Incubus had found a beta-male approach to new-metal: roaring, assymetrical riffs and herky-jerky dynamics coexisting with Boyd's yearning tenor and burgeoning melodic gift." In November 1999, Tulane Hullabaloo writer Henry Rienka claimed that it was a rap rock album in the style of bands such as Hed PE, and wrote that, "their union of grinding guitar, vinyl scratching, and urgent rock/rap vocals produces thrashing, grooving, and bouncing boobies." He added, "Make Yourself just doesn't quite match up with their breakthrough release; 1997's S.C.I.E.N.C.E. On this effort, Incubus seems more concerned with playing with sounds and differentiating themselves from Kid Rock than they do with making enjoyable music." Kevin Stewart-Panko of Canadian publication Exclaim! gave Make Yourself a positive review in December 1999, writing "Incubus is simply an awesome band. They have the distorted guitars, but they also have finger wagging melodies, an actual singer and dance floor elements. It’s similar stuff that plagued Faith No More about ten years ago, and Incubus has a noticeable FNM influence, especially Brandon Boyd's voice, which eerily recalls a youthful Mike Patton."

Despite garnering critical and commercial success, Make Yourself was met with a mixed reaction from some fans of the band, due to its more melodic sound. In a June 2000 interview with Spin, Brandon Boyd claimed, "when the album first came out, we got threatening letters from fans like 'You Sold Out'."

Legacy
The album is listed on the 1001 Albums You Must Hear Before You Die. In 2021, it was named one of the 20 best metal albums of 1999 by Metal Hammer magazine. PopMatters included it on their 2020 list of "The Most Memorable Albums of 1999", with writer Theresa Dougherty remarking that they "became one of the first bands played on modern rock radio to effectively integrate a DJ into their sound" and that "the fundamental struggle for identity within these songs still strikes me with its relevance."

The band went on a major tour of North America in 2019 to celebrate the album's 20th anniversary.

Track listing

Original release

Tour edition bonus disc

Personnel
Credits adapted from the album's liner notes.

Incubus
 Brandon Boyd – vocals; percussion
 Mike Einziger – guitar
 DJ Kilmore – turntables
 Dirk Lance – bass
 Jose Pasillas – drums

Additional personnel

Dave Holdridge – cello on "Drive", "I Miss You", digital editing
Cut Chemist – additional scratching on "Battlestar Scralatchtica"
DJ Nu-Mark – additional scratching on "Battlestar Scralatchtica"
 Michael "Elvis" Baskette – engineer
 Evan Hollander – assisting engineer
 Matt Griffin – assisting engineer
Stephen Marcussen — mastering at A&M
Rick Will – mixing
Scott Litt – mixing

Charts

Weekly charts

Year-end charts

Certifications

References

1999 albums
Incubus (band) albums
Epic Records albums
Immortal Records albums
Albums produced by Scott Litt
Nu metal albums by American artists